John Knight may refer to:

Sports
John Knight (baseball) (1885–1965), American baseball player
John Knight (cricketer), English cricketer
John Knight (footballer) (1902–1990), English footballer

Politicians
John Knight, English name of Zhou Enlai, first Premier of the People's Republic of China
John Knight (fl.1417), MP for Reigate
John Knight (died 1550), MP for Ludgershall
John Knight (died 1566), MP for Hythe
John Knight (MP for Lymington) (died 1621), MP for Lymington
John Knight (died 1683) (1612–1683), English MP for Bristol, 1660–1681
John Knight (died 1708), English MP for Weymouth and Melcombe Regis
John Knight (died 1718), English MP for Bristol, 1685–1691
John Knight (died 1733) (c. 1686–1733), MP for St Germans and Sudbury, son of John Knight died 1708
John Knight (Australian politician) (1943–1981), Australian Senator for Australian Capital Territory, 1975–1981
John H. Knight (politician) (1836–1903), American politician in Wisconsin
John Knight (Alabama politician) (born 1945), American politician

Others
John Knight (artist) (born 1945), American conceptual artist
John Knight (Exmoor pioneer) (1765–1850), moorland reclaimer
John Knight (judge) (1871–1955), former judge of the United States District Court for the Western District of New York
John Knight (Royal Navy officer) (1747–1831), Royal Navy admiral
John Knight (seafarer) (died 1606), English explorer of Greenland and Labrador
John Knight (slave trader) (1708–1774), English slave trader
John Knight (soap maker) (1792-1864), Founder of The Royal Primrose Soap Works
John A. Knight (1931–2009), general superintendent of the Church of the Nazarene
John Buxton Knight (1843–1908), English landscape painter
John Franklin Knight or James Wright (1927–2022), Australian medical professional 
John Gally Knight (c. 1740–1804), English barrister
John George Knight (1826–1892), administrator of the Northern Territory
John Henry Knight (inventor) (1847–1917), engineer, landowner and inventor
John James Knight (1863–1927), Australian journalist
John "Julius" Knight, American house music producer, remixer and DJ
John Lowden Knight (1915–2001), professor, university administrator, and Methodist theologian
John Prescott Knight (1803–1881), English portrait painter
John R. Knight, professor of pediatrics at Harvard Medical School
John S. Knight (1894–1981), newspaper publisher and editor
John Knight (died 1931), estate agent, co-founder of Knight Frank
John Knight, former drummer of the California punk rock band D.I.

See also
Jack Knight (disambiguation)
Jonathan Knight (disambiguation)